Ralph Foster may refer to:
Ralph Foster (American football coach) (1884–1956), college football coach for the Citadel Bulldogs
Ralph Foster (tackle) (1917–1999), American football player
Ralph D. Foster (1893–1984), American broadcaster
Ralph G. Foster (born 1934), British Paralympic athlete